Hugh VII the Brown of Lusignan or Hugues II de La Marche (French: Hugues le Brun) (1065–1151), Sire de Lusignan, Couhé and Château-Larcher and Count of La Marche, was the son of Hugh VI of Lusignan. He was one of the many notable Crusaders in the Lusignan family. In 1147 he took the Cross and followed King Louis VII of France on the Second Crusade.

Hugh married before 1090 Sarrasine or Saracena de Lezay (1067–1144), whose origins are unknown. She may have been identical to the Saracena who was widow of Robert I, Count of Sanseverino.
Their children were:
 Hugh VIII of Lusignan
 William de Lusignan, Lord of Angles
 Rorgo de Lusignan
 Simon de Lusignan, Seigneur de Lezay, fl. 1144, married before 1173 NN, the parents of:
 Guillaume I de Lusignan, Lord of Lezay, who died unmarried and without issue
 Simon II de Lusignan (Deux Sèvres, bef. 1180 – 1200), Lord of Lezay, married before 1195. His children:
 Hugues I de Lezay, Seigneur de Lezay, married to NN, the parents of:
 Jean I de Lezay, Seigneur de Lezay, married to NN, the parents of:
 Claire I de Lezay, Dame de Lezay, married to Pons II d'Aulnay, Vicomte d'Aulnay
 Galeran de Lusignan
 Ænor or Aénor de Lusignan (b. c. 1130), married before 1144 Geoffrey or Geoffroy V de Thouars (c. 1120 – aft. 1176), Vicomte de Thouars, son of Aimery VI de Thouars, Vicomte de Thouars, and wife Agnes=Mathilde de Poitiers

He is mentioned by troubadour Jaufre Rudel in the envoi of "Quan lo rius de la fontana":

References

Sources 

1065 births
1151 deaths
Counts of La Marche
House of Lusignan
11th-century French people
12th-century French people
Christians of the Second Crusade